Lets or variation may refer to:

 let's (vocabulary)
 Local exchange trading system (LETS)
 Lunar Exploration Transportation Services (LETS), the NASA follow-on program to the Human Landing System
 Suzuki Let's motorscooter
 Let's! TV Play Classic, the Let's brand of TV game consoles
 Let's, a popular fictional company present across various films and television series

See also

 
 
 
 
 Let (disambiguation)
 IETS